Patrick J. Deneen (born 1964) is an American political theorist who is Professor of Political Science at the University of Notre Dame.
He studies and writes about political thought, especially American liberal democracy. 
Politically, Deneen advances a form of Catholic communitarianism, citing scholars such as Alexis de Tocqueville and Wendell Berry as influences.
His book Why Liberalism Failed considers the loss of meaning and community in liberal society.

Life and career 
Born in 1964, Deneen was educated at Rutgers University, earning a B.A. in English Literature (1986) and a Ph.D. in Political Science (1995). He taught at Princeton University (1997–2005) as an assistant professor. Deneen joined the faculty at Georgetown University in 2005 and was the Tsakopoulos-Kounalakis Associate Professor of Government until 2012. He began his current position at Notre Dame in 2012. His dissertation, "The Odyssey of Political Theory," was awarded the 1995 American Political Science Association Leo Strauss Award for Best Dissertation in Political Philosophy.

Deneen is a scholar of democracy, liberalism, classical and modern political thought, and American political thought. He is the sole author of four monographs, co-editor of three volumes, and author of numerous academic articles. He has also written for publications including First Things, The American Conservative, The New Atlantis, and Front Porch Republic. Deneen's 2018 book Why Liberalism Failed (Yale University Press) was recommended by former President Barack Obama as part of his summer reading list. Obama wrote that "Why Liberalism Failed offers cogent insights into the loss of meaning and community that many in the West feel, issues that liberal democracies ignore at their own peril." The book has been translated into multiple languages: German, French, Polish, Spanish, Arabic, Croatian, Lithuanian, Korean, Japanese, Hungarian, Czech, and Portuguese.

From 1995–1997, he was Speechwriter and Special Advisor to Joseph Duffey, the Director of the United States Information Agency appointed by President Bill Clinton.

Deneen was Founding Director of the Tocqueville Forum on the Roots of American Democracy housed in the Government Department at Georgetown University from 2006–2012. The Tocqueville Forum was founded in 2006 "to promote civic knowledge and promote inquiry." The Tocqueville Forum hosted many prominent speakers on the Georgetown campus, including the late Associate Justice Antonin Scalia, "Red Tory" Phillip Blond, New York Times columnist David Brooks, and the late Cardinal Francis George. In addition to invited speakers, main activities of the Tocqueville Forum were student conversations with visiting guests, a regular reading group, the student journal Utraque Unum, and an annual student retreat.

Deneen was a founding editor of the web magazine Front Porch Republic, for which he continues to serve as contributing editor. The journal drew inspiration from the writings of Wendell Berry, reflected in its motto: "Place. Limits. Liberty." Deneen wrote first posting of the website, published March 2, 2009, entitled "A Republic of Front Porches," which was later re-published in revised form in the 2018 book, Localism in the Mass Age: A Front Porch Republic Manifesto. Along with the journal The American Conservative, David Brooks in 2012 classified Front Porch Republic as a "paleoconservative" publication influencing the future of conservatism. He described its authors as "suspicious of bigness: big corporations, big government, a big military, concentrated power and concentrated wealth. Writers at that Web site, and at the temperamentally aligned Front Porch Republic, treasure tight communities and local bonds. They're alert to the ways capitalism can erode community. Dispositionally, they are more Walker Percy than Pat Robertson."

Deneen has attributed a number of influences for his form of Catholic communitarianism, including his Ph.D. advisor Wilson Carey McWilliams; Wendell Berry; Christopher Lasch; and Alexis de Tocqueville.

Political engagements 
Deneen was a featured speaker at the 2019 National Conservatism Conference in Washington, DC. In his address, he was in part critical of "National Conservatism", arguing that American nationalism had been a major aim and achievement of progressive philosophers such as Woodrow Wilson, Theodore Roosevelt, and Herbert Croly. He endorsed a nation that was active in supporting more local forms of association: "The nation should be above all devoted to efforts to sustain, foster and support the communities that comprise it, and to combat, where necessary and possible, the modern forces that have proven to be so destructive of those constitutive communities."

In September 2019 Deneen lectured on “The Crisis of Democracy” in the Czech Senát chamber as part of an international conference arranged by the voting reform group Institute H21. In November 2019, Deneen met Hungarian Prime Minister Viktor Orbán as part of a visit to Budapest to discuss the Hungarian translation of Why Liberalism Failed in the Hungarian Academy of Sciences.

In June 2020, Deneen responded to charges leveled by libertarians of lack of loyalty to American liberal founding principles. Accused of hostility to the individualism of American founding principles by George Will, he pointed to a non-liberal, more communitarian strand in the American tradition.

In July 2020, Deneen engaged in two public debates with libertarian conservatives. At the website The American Compass, Deneen debated with former CKE Restaurants CEO Andrew Puzder on the social responsibilities of corporations, in which Deneen argued for greater civic, consumer, and environmental corporate responsibility. He also debated conservative columnist Jonah Goldberg on the consequences of liberalism, arguing that liberalism had increased social isolation, political fragmentation, and economic inequality.

In November 2020 he joined the American Solidarity Party Board of Advisors.

Publications

Books 
 The Odyssey of Political Theory (Rowman & Littlefield, 2000)
 Democratic Faith (Princeton University Press, 2005)
 Conserving America? Thoughts on Present Discontents (St. Augustine Press, 2016)
 Why Liberalism Failed (Yale University Press, 2018)

References

External links 
 

1964 births
American Christian democrats
Catholic philosophers
Georgetown University faculty
Living people
Princeton University faculty
Rutgers University alumni
University of Notre Dame faculty